The Journal of Engineering Education is a quarterly peer-reviewed academic journal covering research on engineering education that is published by the American Society for Engineering Education. The editor-in-chief is Lisa C. Benson (Clemson University).

Abstracting and indexing 
The journal is abstracted and indexed in:
 Science Citation Index
 Social Sciences Citation Index
 Current Contents/Engineering, Computing and Technology
 Current Contents/Social and Behavioral Sciences
 EBSCOhost
 Scopus
According to the Journal Citation Reports, the journal has a 2014 impact factor of 2.059.

References

External links 
 

American Society for Engineering Education
Education journals
Engineering journals
Quarterly journals
Publications established in 1910
English-language journals
Academic journals associated with learned and professional societies